USS Mecosta may refer to:

 a  harbor tug laid down in 1944 and sold in 1981.
 a  Large District Harbor Tug

Mecosta